The Punk, The Bad & The Ugly is an internationally distributed compilation album mostly of artists from USA, and UK.  It was originally released in 1997 as a 24 song CD.  The album was compiled by Cleopatra Records.

Track listing
Part 1
 "Shit Edge" - Christ on a Crutch 1:18
 "Police State In The USA" - Anti-Flag 2:40
 "Teenage Genocide" - Swingin' Utters 1:41
 "War On The Pentagon" - UK Subs 1:48
 "Don't Want To Go" - Loudmouths 1:10
 "Corporate Life"- Hogan's Heroes 1:10
 "Slow Stupid & Hungry" - MDC 1:12
 "Rector Breath" - Ultraman 1:57
 "Home Sweet Home" - Samiam 1:50
 "USA"- Reagan Youth 1:23
 "Stop The Production" - Corrupted Ideals 1:27
 "Thorn In My Side" - No Use For A Name 2:18

Part 2
 "Flossing With An E String"- Kraut 1:41
 "Stab Me In The Back" - Social Unrest 1:12
 "Paranoid World Vision" - Christ on a Crutch 1:37
 "Friend" - Snap Her 1:16
 "Uniform" - Accustomed To Nothing 1:56
 "Tenderloin" - The Nukes 3:35
 "Messages" - Ultraman 2:36
 "Misery" - Squat 2:42
 "Telephone Numbers" - Corrupted Ideals 1:05
 "Self Defense" - Hogan's Heroes 1:04
 "World Overload" - Jack Killed Jill 3:09
 "Cleopatra Jingle" - UK Subs 0:40

Reception
All Music Guide'''s Jason Ankeny said of The Punk, The Bad & The Ugly'' that it was "rare material from both old school and new school punk rockers".

References

1997 compilation albums
Record label compilation albums
1997 albums
Punk rock compilation albums
Hardcore punk compilation albums
Cleopatra Records albums
Cleopatra Records compilation albums
Metalcore compilation albums